Dolores Prestifilippo (born 16 January 1961) is an Italian former professional footballer and manager who coached Como.

References

External links

1961 births
People from Trieste
Italian women's footballers
Italy women's international footballers
Serie A (women's football) players
Women's association football defenders
Women's association football midfielders
A.S.D. Reggiana Calcio Femminile players
ACF Milan players
ASDF Juventus Torino players
S.S.D. F.C. Como Women players
Living people